Wiggen is a surname. People with the surname include:

People
Carlos Wiggen (born 1950), Norwegian novelist
Knut Wiggen (1927– 2016), Norwegian-Swedish composer
Ulla Wiggen (born 1942), Swedish painter

Fictional characters
Henry Wiggen, fictional baseball player in the novels by the American writer Mark Harris

Surnames of Scandinavian origin